Major-General Henry Maughan "Bill" Liardet  (27 October 1906 – 8 February 1996) was a senior British Army officer.

Military career
The son of a British Army officer, Captain Claude Liardet, "Bill" Liardet was born in Birkenhead, England on 27 October 1906. Like his father, Liardet was initially educated at Bedford School, Liardet was commissioned into the Royal Artillery,  Royal Tank Corps in 1927, serving in India and Egypt between 1927 and 1938. In 1939, the year the Second World War began, Liardet was in England attending the Staff College, Camberley, which graduated early due to the war's beginning in September.

During the war he served at the War Office between 1939 and 1941 and commanded the 6th Royal Tank Regiment from 1942 until 1944. In 1945 he was appointed commander of the 25th Armoured Engineer Brigade Royal Engineers. Between 1949 and 1950 he served as commander of the 8th Royal Tank Regiment and, between 1953 and 1956, as commander of the 23rd Armoured Brigade, during which he attended the Imperial Defence College in 1955. From 1956 until 1958 he served as chief of staff to the British Joint Services Mission in Washington, D.C. Liardet retired from the army in 1964. He died in 1996 at the age of 89.

References

External links
British Army Officers 1939−1945
Generals of World War II

1906 births
1996 deaths
Graduates of the Royal College of Defence Studies
British Army major generals
British Army brigadiers of World War II
British military personnel of the Palestine Emergency
Commanders of the Order of the British Empire
Companions of the Distinguished Service Order
Companions of the Order of the Bath
Deputy Lieutenants of Sussex
Graduates of the Staff College, Camberley
Military personnel from Birkenhead
People educated at Bedford School
People from Birkenhead
Royal Tank Regiment officers
War Office personnel in World War II
Royal Artillery officers